Revere Beach is a public beach in Revere, Massachusetts, located about  north of downtown Boston. In 1875, a rail link was constructed to the beach, leading to its increasing popularity as a summer recreation area, and in 1896, it became the first public beach in the United States. It is still easily accessible by the MBTA Blue Line from Boston, and can accommodate as many as one million visitors in a weekend during its annual sand sculpture competition.

History

Colonial to early development 

In the 1620s, the area was first traversed by Europeans settlers. Within the decade, the area thrived as a farming community and after being annexed to Chelsea, Massachusetts from Boston, Massachusetts, the area became known as Chelsea Beach.

In 1875, the Boston, Revere Beach & Lynn Railroad, known as the "Narrow Gauge", came to Chelsea Beach, making it easily accessible to visitors from Boston and elsewhere. Various beach-related and recreational buildings sprang up along the beach itself, which was constrained by the nearness of the railroad to the high tide mark. Several years later in 1881, locals voted to change the name of the beach to Crescent Beach.

On October 1, 1896, the Metropolitan Park Commission (now part of the Massachusetts Department of Conservation and Recreation) assumed control over the beach. Following the design of landscape architect Charles Eliot, the railroad tracks were moved from the beach itself to the alignment now used by the MBTA Blue Line, and hundreds of structures were removed from the beach. On July 12, 1896, Revere Beach was opened as the first public beach in the nation. An estimated 45,000 people showed up on opening day. Only a few weeks later, tens of thousands more fled to the beach to escape the heat wave of 1896.

In the following decades, Revere Beach developed many attractions, including restaurants, dance halls and ballrooms, roller skating rinks, bowling alleys, and roller coasters. Three roller coasters were particularly well-known: the Cyclone, a wooden roller coaster that was the tallest roller coaster ever built at the time of its construction in 1925; the Lightning, another wooden roller coaster; and the Derby Racer, a racing roller coaster. All have since been torn down.

Revere Beach riot of 1920
On the night of August 8, 1920, a riot broke out in Revere Beach when a police officer arrested a United States Navy sailor on the charge of drunkenness. Sailors who were on leave for the weekends saw what happened and attempted to wrestle control of their comrade from a police officer, and the riot ensued. United States Marines and a few United States Army soldiers joined the sailors and surrounded the police station in attempt to free their drunken comrade. Numbering to about 400, mobs of servicemen pelted the station with rocks and fired stolen shooting-gallery weapons at it. Request for assistance was summoned to Federal troops from Fort Banks and the Boston Navy Yard, and the Chelsea Police Department.

A detachment of 200 Army soldiers from Fort Banks arrived with fixed bayonets and assisted police in clearing the beach. The Navy gave orders to its master-at-arms personnel that every sailor in Revere was to be arrested. More than 100 had been placed under arrest and by August 9, military and police authorities finally kept the disorder under control. Many injuries inflicted upon policemen and civilians as well as a mob of five sailors were minor, mostly from flying stones when the mob hurled objects at the police station. The windows were smashed and much of the furniture in the station was broken.

Decline and renewal
The popularity of Revere Beach began to decline in the 1950s as the facilities at the beach deteriorated. In February 1978, a large blizzard destroyed many of the remaining structures, the sidewalks, and the sea wall.

After a significant revitalization effort by city of Revere and the state of Massachusetts, the beach reopened in May 1992. On the weekend of July 19, 1996, Revere commemorated the centennial of the first opening of Revere Beach with a three-day celebration, and on May 27, 2003, Revere Beach was designated a National Historic Landmark. In 2007, Revere Beach Boulevard was redesigned with new landscaping and sidewalks, and improved parking.

New England Sand Sculpting Festival 
The New England Sand Sculpting Festival has taken place at Revere Beach each July since 2004. During the festival, an area of the beach is fenced off, creating a temporary art gallery for visitors. Event organizers have proclaimed that the festival is the largest sand-sculpting contest in New England. A total of $15,000 in prize money was available for the 2010 event. The annual contest draws approximately one million visitors each year.

Water quality 
Starting with the passage of the BEACH Act in 2000, a concentrated effort has been made to improve the water quality of Revere Beach and other beaches in Massachusetts. This includes a public website with water quality results and notifications of beach closures due to waterborne pathogens.

Revere Beach undergoes routine testing for Enterococcus, a pathogen indicating bacteria responsible for illnesses as slight as sore throat to meningitis, gastroenteritis, and encephalitis. The water is tested on a weekly basis at four different sites throughout the summer, from June to August. These sites are Oak Island, Revere Beach Bathhouse (state police station), Beach Street, and Point of Pines. This data is collected by the Massachusetts Water Resources Authority.

Wildlife 
Piping plovers, an endangered species of bird, are known to build their nests along Revere Beach in the Spring. During the birds' nesting season, string and fence enclosures are constructed to protect the birds and their eggs, the latter of which are so small as to blend in with the sand.

See also
List of amusement parks in New England
List of National Historic Landmarks in Massachusetts
National Register of Historic Places listings in Suffolk County, Massachusetts

References

External links

 Revere Beach Reservation Department of Conservation and Recreation
 City of Revere Official Website
 Revere Chamber of Commerce
 Revere Beach.com
 Revere Beach Partnership
 Revere Public Library

1895 establishments in Massachusetts
Beaches of Massachusetts
Landforms of Suffolk County, Massachusetts
Parks in Suffolk County, Massachusetts
National Historic Landmarks in Massachusetts
National Register of Historic Places in Suffolk County, Massachusetts
Protected areas established in 1895
Revere, Massachusetts
State parks of Massachusetts